Kim Christian Priemel (born 1977) is a historian of Germany and former professor at Humboldt University Berlin; he now works for the University of Oslo.

Works

References

Living people
Economic historians
Historians of Germany
1977 births
Legal historians
Academic staff of the Humboldt University of Berlin
Academic staff of the University of Oslo